Sara Gjoni (born in Tirana) is a model and beauty pageant contestant. She won the title Miss Albania in 2011 and represented Albania at Miss Model of the World in 2011. She won the title Miss Bikini in 2011.
She also won in the dance section of the competition.

References

1993 births
Living people
21st-century Albanian models
Albanian female models
Models from Tirana